The Journal of Microscopy is the monthly peer-reviewed scientific journal of the Royal Microscopical Society which covers all aspects of microscopy including spatially resolved spectroscopy, compositional mapping, and image analysis. This includes technology and applications in physics, chemistry, material science, and the life sciences. It is published by Wiley-Blackwell on behalf of the Society. The editor-in-chief is Michelle Peckham, a Cell Biology professor at University of Leeds.
The journal publishes review articles, original research papers, short communications, and letters to the editor. It was established in 1841 as the Transactions of the Microscopical Society of London, obtaining its current name in 1869, with volume numbering restarting at 1.

Abstracting and indexing 

The journals is abstracted and indexed in:

According to the Journal Citation Reports, the journal has a 2020 impact factor of 1.758.

References

External links

Microscopy
Royal Microscopical Society
Wiley-Blackwell academic journals
Publications established in 1841
Monthly journals
English-language journals
Optics journals